Egypt competed at the 2012 Summer Paralympics in London, United Kingdom from August 29 to September 9, 2012. Egypt made their debut at the Paralympic Games in 1972. Since their debut Egypt have won 165 medals (46 gold, 59 silver, 60 bronze). Egypt's most successful appearance at the Paralympic Games was in Atlanta in 1980, winning 30 medals.

Background 
55 of the Egyptian 2012 Summer Paralympic team, including volleyball and table tennis athletes, trained in venues across Lincolnshire, including Boston, Louth and the city of Lincoln.

Karem Elngar was quoted by the BBC as saying of the 2012 Paralympics, "In Egypt there is a negative attitude to disabled people. The Olympics has not helped to discredit this perception."

The delegation stayed at Egremont House and Festive Mansions  in the Paralympic Village.

Medals 
Egypt left London with 15 medals, 4 gold, 4 silver and 7 bronze.  This was an improvement of 3 more bronze medals than they won in Beijing.

Athletics

Men's track

Men's field

Powerlifting
Sherif Othman won gold in powerlifting for Egypt, repeating his winning performance at the 2008 Games. Fatma Omar competed at and became a four-time Paralympic gold medalist in London. Metwalli Mathana appeared in his fifth Paralympic Games.  Egypt finished the London Games with 2 gold, 3 silver and 2 bronze medals. Following the London Games, Egypt's all time medal total in the sport was 59, including 19 golds.

Historically, Egyptian powerlifters have faced a number of barriers despite their obvious success at the Paralympic Games.  They have lacked financial support.  Because of the low numbers of practitioners, there is a lack of awareness among parents of children with disabilities about the potential to get involved with powerlifting.  These low numbers of practitioners also make the sport cost more, which further reduces participation numbers.  The materials provided by the Egyptian Paralympic Committee, and for Disabled Sport Powerlifting Federation are also sometimes wanting in quality, and the cost of distributing them means they are sometimes hard to come by.  It is also hard for Egyptians to go abroad, and to bring foreign lifers to Egypt to assist Egyptians in training.
Men

Women

Sitting volleyball

Men's tournament
Roster

Group play

Quarter-final

5th–8th place semi-final

5th–6th place match

Table tennis

Men's singles

Women's singles

Teams

References

Nations at the 2012 Summer Paralympics
2012
2012 in Egyptian sport